Pancho López was an Argentine comics series in 1957 in Pancho López (magazine) by the writer Abel Santa Cruz, under the pseudonym Lépido Frías, and the cartoonist Alberto Breccia. It featured the humorous adventures of a little Mexican boy called Pancho López.

References

Argentine comics
1957 comics debuts
Child characters in comics
Male characters in comics
Fictional Mexican people
Humor comics
Comics set in Mexico